Nigeria has many public holidays.

Public holidays

Movable holidays 
In addition, Nigeria officially celebrates a few moveable holidays, which occur on different dates every year:

References

Office holidays in Nigeria
All Public Holidays In Nigeria

 
Nigerian culture
Events in Nigeria
Nigeria
Holidays